The entoglossus is an elongated bony process in lizards and birds that projects from the body of the hyoid apparatus into the tongue.

References 

Vertebrate anatomy